Richthofen Place Parkway is a historic parkway in Denver, Colorado. On September 17, 1986, it was added to the National Register of Historic Places.

References

Parkways in the United States
Streets in Colorado
National Register of Historic Places in Denver
Geography of Denver

Roads on the National Register of Historic Places in Colorado
Parks on the National Register of Historic Places in Colorado